The Walking Piano, also called the Big Piano  by its creator, Remo Saraceni, is an oversized synthesizer. Merging dance, music, and play, it is played by the user's feet tapping the keys to make music. Versions of the piano have been installed in museums, children's hospitals, and other public places around the world.

History
Remo Saraceni created a musical daisy for the Bicentennial Celebration in Philadelphia (Design for Fun). From there the concept grew. It took shape with an intermediate stop at an interactive futon, and the first "Big Piano" was built in 1982. The piano was on display at the FAO Schwarz toy store in New York City when famed movie producer/director Steven Spielberg's sister saw it and told her brother all about it.

Versions
An early, one-octave version of the Walking Piano was installed at FAO Schwarz in New York City in 1982. A new three-octave version was specifically created for the 1988 Tom Hanks movie Big at the request of director Penny Marshall. That piano was housed in the Please Touch Museum in Philadelphia, Pennsylvania until about 2013.
Another version of the piano was one made by Elliot Seth Newman, CEO and Founder of Kids Station Toys. This version was sold at select retail stores such as Target, Toys R Us, Walmart, and others. This version was sold as the, "Kids Station Toys: Step-On Piano." The product retailed for about $40 USD. Kids Station Toys made many other piano related toys that succeeded and successfully made millions, the top being the, "Fisher PriceTM Elephant Piano."

Reception
The Walking Piano has continued to enjoy media success, appearing in movies such as The Night Before starring Seth Rogen, Anthony Mackie, and Joseph Gordon-Levitt. It has also featured in TV series such as Dancing With The Stars,  Puttin' On the Ritz , The Simpsons and The Voice Season Premier Feat John Legend. It was also named as one of the most iconic movie props ever.

See also
 Piano
 Digital piano
 Fortepiano
 Musical keyboard
 Organ (music)
 Electric organ

References

External links
The Original Big Piano official website
the Big Piano Trademark Certificate

Piano
Keyboard instruments
Experimental musical instruments
1976 musical instruments